Al Shabhana is a village in western Qatar located in the municipality of Al-Shahaniya.

Etymology
A plant known locally as shabhan, found in abundance in a nearby rawda (depression), gave the village its name.

Sport

References

Populated places in Al-Shahaniya